Vista House is a museum at Crown Point in Multnomah County, Oregon, that also serves as a memorial to Oregon pioneers and as a comfort station for travelers on the Historic Columbia River Highway. The octagonal stone building was designed by Edgar M. Lazarus in the style of Art Nouveau, and completed in 1918 after nearly two years of construction.

In 2000, restoration on the building began, and lasted five years. The Vista House is located within the Corbett locality, and is listed on the National Register of Historic Places.

Vista House is a popular place for viewing the aurora borealis.

History

Construction

The Vista House was designed by Edgar M. Lazarus, a renowned Oregon architect. With its high-grade marble interior and brass fixtures, some Oregonians at the time derided it as the "$100,000 Outhouse" during its construction. The initial funds for the project, allocated by the public, had totaled $3,812.35. According to an itemized list published by the Oregon Historical Society, the building itself eventually cost approximately $70,000, with an additional $9,000 for the accompanying rock wall; $8,000 for paving and gradation; $6,000 to the architect; and $3,000 for other miscellaneous costs.

The original idea for an observatory at the site came from Samuel Lancaster, the consulting engineer for the Columbia River Highway. Lancaster proposed "an observatory from which the view both up and down the Columbia could be viewed in silent communion with the infinite." Construction of the Vista House began December 29, 1916, and was completed in 1918 and dedicated May 5, 1918. The dedication was overseen by Frank Branch Riley of Portland.

Lancaster also suggested the name "Vista House." The Vista House Association, composed of 52 prominent Portland business and civic leaders, was established to raise money for the project. Funding subscriptions failed to raise sufficient money, and most of the cost of construction was paid by Multnomah County. Construction was supervised by John B. Yeon.

Architectural design
Lazarus' design incorporates elements of the Jugendstil, the German interpretation of Art Nouveau which had been popular in Europe in the late 19th century up to 1910. The building is essentially a domed rotunda  in diameter with an octagonal plan on a  diameter base which houses toilets and a gift shop. Stairs lead from the rotunda to an elevated viewing platform at the base of the dome. The exterior is gray sandstone, with a green tile roof. The interior is extensively finished in marble, even in the toilets. The dome interior has bronze lining. The clerestory windows feature opalescent glass in a simple tracery pattern, with similar colored glass at the tops of the windows at the main level.

Restoration efforts

The building is a popular tourist stop for drivers on the Historic Columbia River Highway. The building was refurbished and the interior restored to its 1916 appearance; it reopened in 2005 after five years of restoration work.  The roof was completely rebuilt with new tiles and an underlying membrane. Exterior restoration was complete by 2002. Interior work comprised finish repair and replacement, upgrading the sewer system, and the installation of a geothermal heat pump system. The restoration also made Vista House accessible to the handicapped with a disappearing lift between levels.   From the top of Vista House, which is accessible by stairs, one can view Portland and Vancouver, Washington to the west. Beacon Rock, on the Washington side of the gorge, is visible to the east.

Vista House is owned by the Oregon Department of Transportation. It was placed on the National Register of Historic Places on November 5, 1974. Crown Point was designated a National Natural Landmark in 1971. Vista House is a major contributing structure in the Columbia River Highway National Historic Landmark.

Gallery

See also
National Register of Historic Places listings in Multnomah County, Oregon

References

External links

Friends of Vista House
Crown Point State Scenic Corridor at the Oregon Parks and Recreation Department

Historic Columbia River Highway
National Register of Historic Places in Multnomah County, Oregon
Museums in Multnomah County, Oregon
History museums in Oregon
Art Deco architecture in Oregon
Art Nouveau architecture in Oregon
Edgar M. Lazarus buildings
1918 establishments in Oregon
Individually listed contributing properties to historic districts on the National Register in Oregon
Houses completed in 1918
Observatories in Oregon

Houses on the National Register of Historic Places in Oregon

de:Vista House